Transangelic Exodus is a studio album by American musician Ezra Furman. It was released in February 2018 under Bella Union.

Track listing

Accolades

Charts

References

2018 albums
Ezra Furman albums
Bella Union albums
LGBT-related albums